Kirill is an online science fiction drama. It was commissioned by MSN and produced by Endemol Digital Studios and Pure Grass Films. Episodes are four minutes long and were released twice a week on the internet. The main episodes are narrated by a character, played by David Schofield.

Synopsis

Kirill is a multi-layered drama project, hosted by MSN, and was launched in September 2008. There are ten episodes, each featuring an old man in a lonely room, filled only with a computer and radio apparatus. The man continuously tries to contact someone in order to warn them about an impending danger, the details of which become apparent throughout the series. The room has been shown to be very cold, with pipes probably holding an extremely cold liquid or gas. One of the walls has a poster, displaying a basic set of rules written on it for the old man's survival. He carries a gun with him to protect him from the outside world.

Running alongside these episodes are blogs, video diary entries, photos, and extra content from two other characters, Vivian Villars, and "Quantum Stu", an anonymous male character. Their story is played out across various platforms, and it soon becomes apparent that their fate is intertwined with the character played by David Schofield in the main episodes.

Other

Ten webisodes have been released on the internet. The main character is played by David Schofield, who is obsessed with sending warning messages to Vivian Villars. A small dog is also seen in a window set into the ceiling of the room, to whom the main character gives food.

Episodes

 Tagged
 Water
 Outside
 Night
 Food
 History
 Pain
 Visitor
 Death
 Beginning

External links
 http://www.guardian.co.uk/media/2008/oct/30/digitalmedia-television
 https://www.youtube.com/user/KirillDrama
 http://computer-internet.marc8.com/msn-launches-online-tv-drama-kirill-david-schofield
 http://www.msn.co.uk/kirill
 https://web.archive.org/web/20090301221219/http://www.mipworld.com/en/MIPTV/Conferences-Events/Emmy-awards/

2008 web series debuts
American drama web series